Feldt is a surname. Notable people with the surname include:

Eric Feldt (1899–1968),  Australian writer and a Navy officer
Gloria Feldt (born 1942), American author, speaker, commentator and feminist leader
Kjell-Olof Feldt (born 1931), Swedish Social Democratic politician
Kurt Feldt (1897–1970), German general in the Wehrmacht of Nazi Germany during World War II
Kyle Feldt (born 1992), Australian player
Lutz Feldt (born 1945), German Inspector of the Navy from 2003 to 2006
Marcus Feldt (born 1970), Swedish curler
Maarit Feldt-Ranta (1968–2019), Finnish politician
Pavel Feldt (1905–1960), Soviet conductor and composer
Reine Feldt (1945–1986), Swedish footballer and journalist
Sam Feldt (born 1993), Dutch DJ, record producer and entrepreneur

See also 
Feld
Felt (disambiguation)